= Agenparl =

Italian press agency

Agenparl is the press agency in Italy. It focuses on politics and it provides daily news coming from the Italian parliament. Articles published by the press agency are published in most Italian newspapers.
